The flag of Arkansas, also known as the Arkansas flag, consists of a red field charged with a large blue-bordered white lozenge (or diamond). Twenty-nine five-pointed stars appear on the flag: twenty-five small white stars within the blue border, and four larger blue stars in the white diamond. The inscription "ARKANSAS" appears in blue within the white lozenge, with one star above and three stars below. The star above and the two outer stars below point upwards; the inner star below points downwards. The flag was designed by Willie K. Hocker of Wabbaseka, a member of Pine Bluff Chapter of the Arkansas Society of the Daughters of the American Revolution.

History 
In 1912, the Pine Bluff Chapter of the Daughters of the American Revolution decided to present the newly commissioned battleship USS Arkansas with an official state flag. The chapter contacted Arkansas secretary of state Earle E. Hodges requesting information on how to obtain the state's flag. Hodges then informed the chapter that in fact no such state flag existed. With Hodge's support, the Pine Bluff Chapter began a statewide contest to design a new state flag. A committee was appointed, and it asked for designs to be submitted for consideration. Hocker's design was "a rectangular field of red, on which is placed a large white diamond, bordered by a wide band of blue. Across the diamond is the word 'ARKANSAS'," (placed there by request of the committee) "and the blue stars, one above, two below the word. On the blue band are placed 25 white stars." This flag was adopted by the Arkansas legislature on February 26, 1913.

In 1923, the legislature added a fourth star, representing the Confederate States. This fourth star was originally placed so that there were two stars above the state name and two below; this was to include the Confederate States alongside France, Spain, and the United States. Since this disturbed the other two meanings of the original three stars, the legislature corrected this in 1924 by placing the fourth star above "ARKANSAS" and the original three stars below it, as it is today. The 1924 design was confirmed as law in 1987 by Act 116, signed by Governor Bill Clinton.

In 2011, Act 1205 (formerly House Bill 1546) was signed by Governor Mike Beebe, adding some more details to the flag. In the terms of colors, the red and blue used on the Flag of Arkansas are Old Glory Red and Old Glory Blue. The Act also stated that flags purchased by the Secretary of State must be manufactured in the United States.

In 2018, the original 1913 Arkansas State flag and a 1923 version both underwent an estimated $20,000 in restoration cost.

Symbolism 
The flag's elements have a complex symbolism. According to the 1987 state law defining the flag, the diamond represents Arkansas' status as "the only diamond-bearing state in the Union". (Crater of Diamonds State Park was the only diamond mine in North America at the time, before more recent discoveries in Colorado and Montana. However, the state park is still the only place that the public can search for, and keep, diamonds.) 

The number (25) of white stars around the border of the diamond represents Arkansas' position as the 25th state to join the Union. 

The star above "ARKANSAS" represents the Confederacy, to which Arkansas was admitted on May 18, 1861. 

The three stars below "ARKANSAS" have three separate meanings:
 The three other nations to which Arkansas has belonged (France, Spain, and the U.S.)
 The Louisiana Purchase, which brought Arkansas into the U.S., was signed in 1803.
 Arkansas was the third state (after Louisiana and Missouri) formed from the Louisiana Purchase.
The statute states that the two outer, upward-pointing stars of the three are considered "twin stars" representing the "twin states" of Arkansas and Michigan, which it claims were admitted together on June 15, 1836.  However, that part of the statute contains two inaccuracies:
 The three stars were in a single row in Hocker's original design; they were not arranged in a triangle until later. Though one source indicates that the "twin states" symbolism was added by the 44th Arkansas General Assembly, another states Hocker's "twin stars" are actually two of the 25 stars in the diamond, in the far left and right points; the latter is more consistent with the original design, even though Michigan is actually the 26th state.
 While both states' acts of admission were signed by President Andrew Jackson on that day and Arkansas became a state immediately, Michigan was offered admission only on condition of ceding the Toledo Strip to Ohio in exchange for the Upper Peninsula. Once that happened, it was finally admitted on January 26, 1837.

In 2001, a survey conducted by the North American Vexillological Association (NAVA) placed the Arkansas state flag 45th in design quality out of the 72 Canadian provincial, U.S. state, and U.S. territory flags ranked.

Salute
The law defining the flag also defines a text to be used in saluting the flag: "I salute the Arkansas Flag with its diamond and stars. We pledge our loyalty to thee." The salute was written by author Virginia Belcher Brock.

See also

 List of Arkansas state symbols
 List of flags by design
 List of U.S. state, district, and territorial insignia

References

Further reading

External links

 
 Arkansas state flag protocol
 

 
1913 establishments in Arkansas
Daughters of the American Revolution
Arkansas
Arkansas
Arkansas
Lost Cause of the Confederacy